The papal apartments is the non-official designation for the collection of apartments, which are private, state, and religious, that wrap around a courtyard (the Courtyard of Sixtus V, Cortile di Sisto V) on two sides of the third (top) floor of the Apostolic Palace in Vatican City.

Since the 17th century, the papal apartments have been the official residence of the pope in his religious capacity (as supreme pontiff). Prior to 1870, the pope's official residence in his temporal capacity (as sovereign of the Papal States) was the Quirinal Palace, which is now the official residence of the president of the Italian Republic. The papal apartments are referred to in Italian by several terms, including appartamento nobile and appartamento pontificio.

Facilities
The apartments include about ten rooms including a vestibule, a small studio office for the papal secretary, the pope's private study, the pope's bedroom in the corner of the building, a medical suite (which includes dental equipment and equipment for emergency surgery), a dining room, a small living room, and the kitchen. There is a roof garden and staff quarters for the nuns (German Benedictines) who run the Prefecture of the Pontifical Household (papal household). It is from the window of his small study that the pope greets and blesses pilgrims to Saint Peter's Square on Sundays. The private library has been described as a "vast room with two windows overlooking Saint Peter's Square." The pope's private chapel occupies the top storey on the east side of the Cortile di Sisto V.

Residency
The pope usually lives at the papal apartments except for the months of July to September, when the Papal Palace of Castel Gandolfo is the official summer residence. Three of the last five popes, John XXIII, John Paul I, and John Paul II, died in the papal apartments; the fourth, Paul VI, died at Castel Gandolfo, whilst the fifth, Benedict XVI, resigned and lived at Castel Gandolfo before moving into his new residence within the Vatican.

However, Pope Francis, after his election, declined to stay in the papal apartments in favour of his two-room residence in the Domus Sanctae Marthae. Similarly, he stayed in an apartment instead of the Archbishop's Palace during his tenure as Archbishop of Buenos Aires.

Renovations
The papal apartments are customarily renovated according to each new pope's preferences.

Prior to the renovation in 2005, following the death of Pope John Paul II and the election of Pope Benedict XVI, the papal apartments had reportedly been in disrepair, with "outmoded furnishings and lack of lighting" and large drums placed in the false ceiling to catch water leaks. The 2005 renovation, carried out over three months while Benedict was in summer residence at Castel Gandolfo, included the building of a new library to accommodate Benedict's 20,000 books (placed in exactly the same order as in his previous residence), upgrading the electrical wiring (125-volt electrical outlets, phased out in Italy years prior, were replaced with 220-volt outlets) and plumbing (new pipes were installed to replace those "encrusted with rust and lime"). The heating system was repaired and the kitchen was refurbished, reportedly with new ovens, ranges, and other appliances donated by a German company. The floors, which are 16th-century marble slabs and inlay, were restored. The medical studio ("hastily installed in the papal lodgings for the ailing John Paul II") was renovated and expanded to include dental facilities, and the papal bedroom was completely redone. Wallpaper and other furnishings were put in throughout. The project was carried out by over 200 architects, engineers, and workers. Benedict also moved personal possessions to the papal apartments, including an upright piano.

Transfer

On 21 October 2016, the Vatican announced that the Palace of Castel Gandolfo would now open to the general public as part of a museum. The palace was the final part of the papal apartments to open to the public over a two-year period.

See also
 Index of Vatican City-related articles

References

Apostolic Palace
Apartment buildings
Official residences in Vatican City